Alexandros Parras (born 12 May 1998) is a Greek professional footballer who plays as a left-back for Super League 2 club AEK Athens B.

Career

Panetolikos
Parras began his career with the youth club of Panetolikos. He signed his first professional contract in August 2017.

He made his Superleague debut on 21 October 2017 in a match against Kerkyra.

AEK Athens
On 7 June 2021, AEK Athens officially announced the signing of Parras on a five-year deal.

Career statistics

References

External links
SuperLeague Profile

1998 births
Living people
Greek footballers
Greece under-21 international footballers
Super League Greece players
Panetolikos F.C. players
Place of birth missing (living people)
Association football defenders
Footballers from Ioannina
AEK Athens F.C. B players